"Mixed Up S.O.B." is the first single from The Presidents of the United States of America's album These Are the Good Times People. The single includes the song "Ballad of the Unstoppable Female (The Anna Nicole Smith Story)" as a B-side track.

The song dates to 1987; a version was recorded that year for the Chris Ballew's pre-PUSA band Egg's album Feel Better as "Son of a Bitch", which was released in 1989.

Music video
The music video, which was directed by friend and fellow musician "Weird Al" Yankovic, predominantly features a flipbook effect, in which a person is holding a flipbook in front of the camera and the footage is digitally transferred onto the pages. This animation is spliced with footage of the band performing the song in front of a green screen and painted hands (acting as puppets) singing and dancing to the song.

During one part of the video, the song can be seen being played on Guitar Hero III: Legends of Rock. The song was not in the game, but done specifically for the video.

External links
 "Mixed Up S.O.B." music video on YouTube

2008 singles
The Presidents of the United States of America (band) songs
1987 songs
Songs written by Chris Ballew